Seven ships of the Royal Navy have been named HMS Sirius after the brightest star in the night sky.

  was the flagship of the First Fleet to Australia.
  was a 36-gun fifth-rate frigate, and served during the Napoleonic Wars until she was lost at the Battle of Grand Port, Isle de France.
  was a fifth-rate frigate. She was never commissioned and apparently spent her whole career at Portsmouth in ordinary until she was broken up there in 1862.
  was an  wooden screw sloop sold in 1885.
  was an  protected cruiser that served in World War I.
  was a  light cruiser in World War II.
 SS Sirius (1837)

Related
  - Royal Australian Navy replenishment vessel, named in honour of First Fleet ship HMS Sirius (1786).

Royal Navy ship names